Teiichi Nishi (31 August 1907 – 3 February 2001) was a Japanese sprinter. He competed in the men's 200 metres and the men's 4 x 400 meters relay events at the 1932 Summer Olympics.

References

1907 births
2001 deaths
Place of birth missing
Japanese male sprinters
Olympic male sprinters
Olympic athletes of Japan
Athletes (track and field) at the 1932 Summer Olympics
Japan Championships in Athletics winners
20th-century Japanese people